Mahender Pratap Singh (born 28 February 1945) is an Indian politician and member of 
Indian National Congress. Born in a small village (Nawada Koh.) of Faridabad (Haryana), Singh is a graduate of Nehru college. He was elected twice as a Cabinet Minister in Haryana government, five times as an MLA and once Block Samiti Chairman.

Early life 
Singh was born on 28 February 1945, at Nawada Koh. to Dalipo Devi and Ch. Net Ram Singh. He was married to Rajkali Devi in 1961. Schooling was done from S.D. college, Palwal. Singh was born in an agricultural family, his father was a social activist. Ch. Net Ram was elected as the first chairman of Gurgaon (now Gurugram) Zila Parishad of Punjab state. Ram was a renowned Kissan leader of his time. He organised a famous rally of  Pt. Jawaharlal Nehru in 1960. He was a founder chairman of government college, Faridabad. He died of cancer in 1965.

Political career 

Singh was elected as Sarpanch in 1966 at the age of 21. He was also elected to Block Samiti in 1972.

Elected as MLA in 1982 with a record win of 22000 votes, in 1987 by 19000 votes, in 1991 from 30000 votes, and in 2005 (63000 votes), 2009 (13000 votes).

He has serves twice as a Cabinet Minister in Haryana Government- 1991–96 (food n supplies.) and second time in 2009–14 (power, industries, labour and employment, local bodies, renewable energy, food supplies, revenue, technical education.)

He remains a leader of congress legislative party from 1987 to 1991.

References

External links
MLA Details - Haryana Vidan Sabha
 https://www.youtube.com/watch?v=uy47WB1vgpk
 https://www.youtube.com/watch?v=XCVPJGqxkbI
 https://www.youtube.com/watch?v=z93gvNA21BY

1945 births
Indian National Congress politicians
Living people
Haryana MLAs 2009–2014
People from Faridabad
State cabinet ministers of Haryana
Haryana MLAs 1982–1987
Haryana MLAs 1987–1991
Haryana MLAs 1991–1996
Haryana MLAs 2005–2009